Liolaemus pagaburoi is a species of lizard in the family Iguanidae.  It is endemic to Argentina.

References

pagaburoi
Lizards of South America
Reptiles of Argentina
Endemic fauna of Argentina
Reptiles described in 1999
Taxa named by Raymond Laurent